Trybuna was a Polish left-wing newspaper, often seen as the outlet of the post-communist factions (Social Democracy of the Republic of Poland, Democratic Left Alliance).

History and profile
Trybuna inherited many traditions, including its name, from Trybuna Ludu, the official newspaper of the Polish United Workers' Party.  The publisher of the paper was Ad Novum.

The paper ceased to exist on 7 December 2009 (last issue published on 4 December). The official reason: outstanding liabilities towards cooperators and the Polish national Social Insurance Institution (ZUS). Its last editor-in-chief was Wiesław Dębski.

The circulation of Trybuna was 48,509 copies in January–February 2001. Its 2009 circulation was 50,000 copies.

Editors-in-chief

References

1990 establishments in Poland
2009 disestablishments in Poland
Defunct newspapers published in Poland
Newspapers published in Warsaw
Daily newspapers published in Poland
Polish-language newspapers
Publications established in 1990
Publications disestablished in 2009